The Northland mudfish (Neochanna heleios, heleios meaning marsh dwelling, neochanna meaning compound word of neo for new and channa for anchovy) is a galaxiid of the genus Neochanna, found only in swampy locations west of the Bay of Islands in Northland, New Zealand.  Its length is up to 134 mm.

References

 
 NIWA June 2006
  Royal Society of NZ

Northland mudfish
Endemic freshwater fish of New Zealand
Fish of the North Island
Northland mudfish